Bengbu Rail Transit, is a rapid transit monorail system and a tram system under construction and planned in Bengbu, Anhui, China. It will connect the urban area of Bengbu with Huaiyuan and Fengyang counties, which are under Bengbu and Chuzhou's administration, respectively. According to the plan it will be constructed in three phases. In 2020, the draft of the standard of the tram was published.

History
In March 2014, the Bengbu City Planning and Design Institute began to compile the “Bengbu City Rail Transit Network Plan”. After surveying households and major hub areas, the general direction of the rail transit road network was determined. In August 2015, the plan passed the technical review of the expert group. In March 2016, the executive meeting of the Bengbu City Government formally reviewed and approved the plan. According to the plan, Bengbu Rail Transit will be constructed in three phases. In the initial stage, the construction of Line 1 and Line 2 will form a "Z" -shaped main development axis. In the development stage, a radial track network was formed by constructing extensions of Line 1 and Lines 3 and 4. In the improvement stage, a more complete rail transit network of "grid + radiation" will be formed by constructing extension lines 1, 4 and 5 and 6. Construction begun on an starter section of Line 2 in 2018. In 2020,Bengbu add the plan of the tram.

Lines

References

Bengbu
Rapid transit in China
Transport infrastructure under construction in China
Monorails in China